Maekawa Dam is a rockfill dam located in Yamagata Prefecture in Japan. The dam is used for flood control. The catchment area of the dam is 21.2 km2. The dam impounds about 35  ha of land when full and can store 4400 thousand cubic meters of water. The construction of the dam was started on 1971 and completed in 1982.

References

Dams in Yamagata Prefecture
1982 establishments in Japan